Hierocaesarea or Hierokaisareia, from the Greek for 'sacred' and the Latin for 'Caesar's', also known as Hieracome or Hierakome, was a town and bishopric in the late Roman province of Lydia, the metropolitan see of which was Sardis. It was inhabited during Hellenistic, Roman, and Byzantine times.

History
This town is mentioned by Ptolemy. Judging from its coins, it worshipped the goddess Artemis Persica.
 
Its site is located between Sazoba and Kumkuyucak in Asiatic Turkey.

Bishopric
It is mentioned as an episcopal see in all the Notitiae Episcopatuum until the 12th or 13th century,. but we know only three of its bishops: 
Cosinius, at the Council of Chalcedon, 451; 
Zacharias, at the Second Council of Nicaea, 787;
Theodore, at the Council of Constantinople (879-880).

The see remains a (vacant) titular see in the Roman Catholic Church, with nominal bishops appointed.
Bishop Ernesto de Paula (1960.01.09 – 1994.12.31)
Bishop Timothy Phelim O'Shea, O.F.M. Cap. (1950.05.24 – 1959.04.25)
Bishop Franz Justus Rarkowski, S.M. (1938.01.07 – 1950.02.09)
Bishop John Marie Laval (1911.09.11 – 1937.06.04)
Bishop Giuseppe Astuni (1903.01.21 – 1911.02.21)
Bishop Alessandro Beniamino Zanecchia-Ginnetti, O.C.D. (1902.06.09 – 1902.06.18)
Bishop Désiré-François-Xavier Van Camelbeke, M.E.P. (1884.01.15 – 1901.11.09)
Bishop Luigi Bienna (1845.04.24 – 1882.07.02)
Bishop John Bede Polding, O.S.B. (later Archbishop) (1832.07.03 – 1842.04.05)
Bishop-elect José Seguí, O.E.S.A. (later Archbishop) (1829.07.27 – 1830.07.05)
Bishop Antonio Maria Trigona (later Archbishop) (1806.03.31 – 1817.07.28)
Bishop Gregory Stapleton (1800.11.07 – 1802.05.23)
Bishop Charles Berington (1786.06.02 – 1798.06.08)
Bishop Santiago Hernández, O.P. (1757.08.13 – 1777.02.06)
Bishop Louis-Joseph de Châteauneuf de Rochebonne (1720.03.04 – 1722.03.01)

References

Sources
 

Populated places in ancient Lydia
Former populated places in Turkey
Roman towns and cities in Turkey
History of Manisa Province
Catholic titular sees in Asia
Populated places of the Byzantine Empire
Achaemenid Anatolia